From 2000 to the present, at least 28 tropical or subtropical cyclones affected the U.S. state of Louisiana. According to David Roth of the Hydrometeorological Prediction Center (HPC), a tropical cyclone makes landfall along the coastline about two times every three years, and a hurricane makes landfall once every 2.8 years.

The most active month for tropical cyclone activity in the state is September, with ten total storms, while no recorded storms have affected Louisiana during the months of December through May. The most intense storm to affect the state in terms of barometric pressure is Hurricane Katrina of 2005, which also caused the most fatalities and damage with 1,833 total deaths and over $100 billion in total damages. Katrina is also tied with Hurricane Harvey of 2017 as the  costliest hurricane in the Atlantic basin. The 2020 hurricane season has seen the most landfalling tropical cyclones in a single season with 5 total storms.

2000–2004

In Terrebonne Parish, strong thunderstorm winds associated with the depression damage trailers and boats in Bayou Black, resulting in $2,500 in damages.
This results in catastrophic flooding across the state. Major river flooding occurs in Amite River and Comite River, which experience their highest water levels since 1983. Homes are destroyed and swept away by flooding across the state. In Zachary, a man is killed after a tornado knocks a tree onto his truck. Damages from Tropical Storm Allison in Louisiana alone total to $65 million.
August 6, 2001 – Tropical Storm Barry causes tides of  along the southeastern coast of Louisiana before it makes landfall on Santa Rosa Beach, Florida on August 6. Prior to making landfall, tropical storm watches and warnings are issued along the Gulf Coast, west to New Orleans.
Streets were flooded by the heavy rainfall in Slidell. In St. Tammany Parish, surface runoff from flash flooding causes some rivers to exceed flood stage. Damage in Louisiana totaled to $150,000 (2002 USD, $180,000 2008 USD).
September 5, 2002 – Tropical Storm Fay develops offshore the Louisiana coast before making landfall in Texas as a moderate tropical storm. Prior to making landfall, a tropical storm warning is issued for western parts of Louisiana east to Intracoastal City.
Despite making landfall on Louisiana, as a result of convection displaced east of the center, the state receives primarily minimal effects from Hanna. No significant flooding resulted from high tides caused by the storm.

The heavy rains cause the failure of drainage systems, leaving numerous streets flooded. In Terrebonne Parish, 200–300 homes are flooded. The rains also damage large plots of sugar cane crop in Southwest Louisiana.
October 3, 2002 – Hurricane Lili made landfall on the morning of October 3 near Intracoastal City, as a weakening category 1 hurricane. A total of 237,000 people lost power, and oil rigs offshore were shut down for up to a week. Crops were badly affected, particularly the sugar cane, damage totaled nearly $175 million (2002 USD). No direct deaths were reported as early warnings and the compact nature of the storm circumvented major loss of life.
In Montegut, the surge breached a levee still was damaged from the effects of Hurricane Lili 9 months before. The breach flooded many homes in the town, forcing the evacuation of an entire neighborhood. As a result, 150 homes in the town were damaged, with half of them severely. The storm surge affected numerous low-lying cities in southeastern Louisiana by flooding roadways, including the only road to Grand Isle, stranding residents and visitors. The floodwaters entered a few homes and businesses in St. Tammany Parish. Damage from the storm surge totaled to $4.1 million (2003 USD). Rough waves sank two boats offshore, though their occupants were rescued.
August 31, 2003 – Tropical Storm Grace drops light rainfall across the state.
In Plaquemines Parish, several school and government building as well as about 100 mobile homes. Additionally, about 50 electrical poles were toppled. About a dozen structure in St. Bernard Parish were damaged. Storm surge flooded several low-lying areas in southeastern Louisiana. About 55,000 customers lost power during the storm. Four people died during evacuation and damage in the state reached roughly $7.9 million. Upon the storm's second landfall in Holly Beach resulted in minor coastal flooding, with damage totaling only about $15,000. Inland, generally light rainfall was recorded.
The storm surge and waves resulted in significant beach erosion in Grand Isle. In addition, a tornado caused damage to the roof of a trailer in Golden Meadow. Rainfall and storm surge flooded 20 homes in Terrebonne Parish. In addition, several homes in Lafouche Parish experienced flooding, including two with over two feet of water. Numerous homes in Golden Meadow experienced flooding, as well. The flooding also forced the temporary closing of numerous roads across the state, including portions of Route 11 and Interstate 10. Flood waters from the storm cracked a water line in LaPlace, leaving nearly 30,000 residents and many businesses without tap water. The problem was expected to take little time to fix, though residents were advised to boil the water before drinking it. Matthew also left 2,500 people without power for a short period of time. The storm's impact also closed several schools. In all, Matthew caused $255,000 in damage (2004 USD).

2005–2009

Rainfall also left scattered street flooding. With thousands losing electrical power, the city experienced its worst blackout since Hurricane Betsy in 1965, only to be trumped by Hurricane Katrina less than eight weeks later.
The failures of the levees were considered the worst engineering disaster in the history of the United States. Thousands of people were stranded inside their homes or on rooftops and required rescue from boats and helicopters. Many buildings and homes were damaged, with 134,000 housing units – approximately 70% of residences in New Orleans – were impacted to some degree. The Superdome, which was sheltering many people who had not evacuated, sustained significant damage. Two sections of the Superdome's roof were compromised and the dome's waterproof membrane had essentially been peeled off. The famous French Quarter and Garden District escaped flooding because those area are above sea level. A total of 573 deaths occurred in New Orleans alone. Several other parishes were severely impacted by the storm. Many areas outside of New Orleans also suffered wind damage, especially St. Tammany and Washington parishes. According to the United States Department of Housing and Urban Development, in St. Bernard Parish, 81% (20,229) of the housing units were damaged. In St. Tammany Parish, 70% (48,792) were damaged, and in Plaquemines Parish 80% (7,212) were damaged. Nearly 900,000 Louisianians were left without electricity. Throughout the state, 1,577 fatalities were reported. Overall, it is estimated that Hurricane Katrina caused $108 billion in damage throughout the Southern United States, with much of the damage occurring in Louisiana and Mississippi.
September 24, 2005 – Hurricane Rita made landfall as a Category 3 hurricane on the Texas-Louisiana border with maximum sustained winds of 115 mph. Devastaing storm surge destroyed coastal communities in Cameron Parish such as Holly Beach, but only one person was killed throughout the state due to mass evacuations which were heeded in the wake of the devastation wrought by Katrina nearly a month prior to New Orleans. Damage totaled at least $8 billion throughout the state. 
September 13, 2007 – Hurricane Humberto passed through the state as a weakening tropical storm after making landfall at High Island, Texas as a Category 1 hurricane. Damage and impacts were fairly limited across the state. 
September 22, 2007 – Tropical Depression Ten was the first tropical cyclone to directly threaten New Orleans since Katrina. Damage and impacts were generally limited across the state, however.  
August 4, 2008 – Tropical Storm Edouard made landfall near Gilchrist, Texas with maximum sustained winds of 65 mph. Tropical storm force winds occurred in several locations across southwest Louisiana, but impacts were limited in scope. 
September 1, 2008 – Hurricane Gustav reached the Louisiana coast on the morning of September 1, making landfall near Cocodrie, Louisiana as a Category 2 with maximum sustained winds of 105 mph. The center of the storm continued northwest across the state resulting in significant damage and 7 deaths; 34 parishes were declared as disaster areas.
September 13, 2008 – Hurricane Ike made landfall on Galveston Island in Texas as a large, high-end Category 2 with maximum sustained winds of 110 mph. Significant storm surge occurred across the southwest Louisiana coast and 6 people died across the state from the storm.
November 10, 2009 – Hurricane Ida passed by the southeast Louisiana coast as a weakening tropical storm before making landfall near Dauphin Island, Alabama.

2010–2019

More than 100 homes were flooded and 20 bridges and roads were washed away. Severe weather related to the system caused further damage the following day. In all, damage from Bonnie amounted to $810,000.
Mid–August 2010 – Tropical Depression Five – The remnants of Tropical Depression Five make two separate landfalls within the state. Upon its classification as a Tropical Depression, the National Hurricane Center issues a tropical storm warning for much of southern Louisiana, including New Orleans. The storm ultimately dissipates prior to reaching the coastline, and the remnants of the cyclone produce riptides and strong waves along the coast. A local National Weather Service office issues flood watches for up to twelve Louisiana parishes. As the remnants of the cyclone regain strength in the Gulf of Mexico and approach the state for a second time, a coastal flood watch is issued for southern portions of the state. Up to sixteen hours of intense rain and thunderstorms flood at least 40 buildings and structures in Avoyelles Parish, Louisiana.
September 4, 2011 – Tropical Storm Lee – A state of emergency is declared for New Orleans ahead of Lee, with the threat of the storm prompting the preparation of rescue boats across the city and city officials ordering the closure of floodgates. Due to its slow and erratic motion across the state, Lee drops torrential rainfall across much of southern Louisiana. Headwinds from the storm fan a large and destructive fire in Natchitoches Parish, Louisiana, where about 400 acres of land is set ablaze and subsequently destroyed. In addition, several homes in Slidell are inundated by a four-foot storm surge. New Orleans also suffers sporadic power outages, but escapes with only minor flooding.
June 23–24, 2012 – Initially forecast to brush the state as a hurricane, Tropical Storm Debby prompted a state of emergency. The storm ultimately tracked far right of early predictions and struck Florida.
August 29, 2012 – Hurricane Isaac – Isaac comes ashore the state twice as a large Category 1 hurricane, producing an eleven-foot storm surge in Shell Beach. The storm produces sustained tropical storm-force winds and hurricane-force wind gusts in Grand Isle, leaving over 600,000 customers without power across the state. The city of LaPlace, St. John the Baptist Parish was one of the hardest hit areas. A lack of a hurricane levee system and 8–10 ft storm surge caused massive flooding of hundreds of homes. Over 3,000 residents had to be rescued from their homes. In addition, many pumping stations in Slidell were unable to keep up with rainfall rates and the city suffered flood damage as a result.
October 6, 2013 – A state of emergency was declared ahead of Tropical Storm Karen; however, the storm dissipated over the northern Gulf of Mexico and had negligible effects in the state.
June 22, 2017 – Tropical Storm Cindy made landfall in extreme southwest Louisiana just east of Sabine Pass with maximum sustained winds of 50 mph, making it the first tropical cyclone to make landfall in the state since Hurricane Isaac in 2012.
August 30, 2017 – Hurricane Harvey made its third and final United States landfall in the Sabine Pass as a weakened tropical storm causing significant flooding across southwest Louisiana.  
October 8, 2017 – Hurricane Nate made landfall in the Mississippi River delta with 85 mph winds causing some moderate damage.
July 13, 2019 – Hurricane Barry made its first landfall at Marsh Island followed shortly thereafter with its second and final landfall near Intracoastal City as a minimal Category 1 hurricane with maximum sustained winds of 75 mph. Barry was one of four hurricanes to hit Louisiana at Category 1 intensity in the month of July, the others being Bob in 1979, Danny in 1997, and Cindy in 2005. With fears that the levees won't support the rainfall rates from Barry combined with an already swollen Mississippi River, the United States Army Corps of Engineers issued a mandatory evacuation for Plaquemines Parish. The slow moving storm has dropped locally heavy rain with a peak total of  near Ragley, Louisiana.
October 26, 2019 – The remnants of Tropical Storm Olga produced 10–15 in (254–381 mm) throughout Southeastern Louisiana.

2020–present

June 7, 2020 – Tropical Storm Cristobal made landfall east of Grand Isle with maximum sustained winds of 50 mph. Storm surge from Cristobal reached a total of 5 ft (1.5 m) along the coastline. Infrastructure damage to southern Louisiana totaled nearly $150 million.
August 24, 2020 – Hurricane Marco, passed just south of the Mississippi River delta as a weak tropical storm.
August 27, 2020 – Hurricane Laura, as a high-end Category 4 hurricane, made landfall near the Louisiana–Texas border in Cameron Parish and simultaneously tied the 1856 Last Island hurricane as the strongest tropical cyclone ever to make landfall in Louisiana with maximum sustained winds of 150 mph. Storm surge as high as 17 feet was measured at Rutherford Beach and a wind gust of 137 mph was recorded at Lake Charles. Widespread severe damage occurred across southwest Louisiana with coastal areas experiencing devastating storm surge and inland areas experiencing catastrophic wind damage. 33 people died in Louisiana from the storm and an estimated $17.5 billion in damage was inflicted across the state.
October 9, 2020 – Hurricane Delta made landfall 15 miles east of where Laura made landfall as a Category 2 hurricane with maximum sustained winds of 100 mph. Delta hampered the ongoing recovery efforts from Laura which made landfall six weeks prior.
October 28, 2020 – Hurricane Zeta made landfall near Cocodrie, Louisiana as a Category 3 hurricane with maximum sustained winds of 115 mph, with the eye passing directly over the entire city of New Orleans. Zeta also surpassed the 1921 Tampa Bay hurricane for the latest date in a calendar year in which a major hurricane has made landfall in the continental United States.
June 19, 2021 – Tropical Storm Claudette formed near Houma, Louisiana and brought gusty winds and heavy rainfall to the southeastern portions of the state.
August 29, 2021 - Hurricane Ida made landfall at Port Fourchon, Louisiana as a high-end Category 4 hurricane with maximum sustained winds of 150 mph, the same day as the 16th anniversary of Katrina making landfall in the state. 33 people were killed and at least $18 billion in insured damage was inflicted across the state.

Monthly statistics

Deadly storms
The following is a list of hurricanes that caused known deaths in the state.

See also

Atlantic hurricane season
List of Atlantic hurricanes
List of wettest known tropical cyclones affecting Louisiana

Notes

References

 2000
Louisiana 2000
Hurricanes